Prince Gheorghe Grigore Cantacuzino (22 September 1833 – 22 March 1913), was a Romanian politician and lawyer, one of the leading Conservative Party policymakers. Among his political posts were minister of public instruction in Romania, president of the chamber, and president of the senate. He twice served as the Prime Minister of Romania: between 23 April 1899 and 19 July 1900, and between 4 January 1906 and 24 March 1907. He resigned from office after failing to put down the large-scale peasants' revolt. He was the 20th Romanian politician to serve as Prime Minister.

The wealthy Cantacuzino was born into the aristocratic Cantacuzino family, of Phanariote origins. He built the Cantacuzino Palace of Bucharest and the Cantacuzino Castle of Bușteni. He was the father of Grigore Gheorghe Cantacuzino and Mihail G. Cantacuzino, as well as the father-in-law of Alexandrina Pallady-Cantacuzino.

References

External links
 Biography

1833 births
1913 deaths
Gheorghe
Mayors of Bucharest
Prime Ministers of Romania
Romanian Ministers of Agriculture
Romanian Ministers of Finance
Romanian Ministers of Public Works
Romanian Ministers of Interior
Romanian Ministers of Justice
Members of the Chamber of Deputies (Romania)
Members of the Senate of Romania
Presidents of the Chamber of Deputies (Romania)
Presidents of the Senate of Romania
Conservative Party (Romania, 1880–1918) politicians